Stitched is a 2011 American horror short film written and directed by Garth Ennis. It was created in attempt to draw interest in a feature, and to promote Ennis's own comic book series of the same name, the first issue of which was published by Avatar Press two months after the film's July premiere at the 2011 San Diego Comic-Con International.

Plot 

In Eastern Afghanistan, three NATO operatives (one of whom, Lieutenant Pruitt, is injured) trek through the desert in search of aid, the only survivors of Black Hawk Idaho Six, which had crashed while on a mission to extract the British unit Bravo One-Five. During their journey, the trio encounter a bloodied and hysterical Taliban fighter who Cooper shoots, discovering afterward that the man's firearm was damaged and empty.

The soldiers later stumble onto five more Taliban fighters, all dead, and with their heavily mutilated remains showing signs of dismemberment and organ removal. A rattling noise then permeates the area, prompting a hidden quartet of camouflaged men armed with crude melee weapons to start advancing on the NATO personnel. The men do not respond to Corporal Twiggs's attempts to communicate with them, and are unaffected by being shot, even in the legs and head. The quartet begin to overpower the NATO crew, and during the struggle two of the assailants have their shrouds ripped off, revealing them to be withered corpses whose facial orifices are sewn shut.

The source of the rattling sound is revealed to be a man dressed in black robes who is swinging a can full of rocks. The figure is shot to death by the surviving three members of Bravo One-Five, silencing the shaken pebbles and causing the zombies to become inert. The Bravo One-Five members help the NATO crew recover, and explain that they had earlier been attacked by the "Stitched" creatures, which can seemingly only be stopped by taking out their masters, and by blowing them up while they are in their stupored state. Having already used up all of their C-4 in earlier battles, the six soldiers are forced to leave the immobilized "Stitched" unmolested, though as they vacate the area Twiggs notices that one of the creatures appears to be shedding tears.

Cast 
 Tank Jones as Lieutenant Pruitt
 Lauren Alonzo as Cooper
 Kate Kugler as Corporal Twiggs
 Nick Principe as Taliban Fighter/Lead Stitched
 Dave Hamdan as Dead Taliban
 Cyrus Lassus as Dead Taliban
 Bhavin Patel as Dead Taliban
 Eric Zaragoza as Stitched
 Omair Khokhar as Stitched
 Raj Suri as Stitched
 George Nelson as Black Robed Figure
 Andrew DeCarlo as Tony Barclay
 Kevin Tye as Dave Lynch
 Carlo LaTempa as Baz

Reception 

Ain't It Cool News was critical of the "clunky acting and unsuspenseful scenes" and opined that the short was "just kind of plain and soulless". Conversely, James Ferguson of HorrorTalk praised the production values, most of the acting, and the makeup effects, and awarded the film a score of 4/5. In a review written for Forbidden Planet International, James Bacon held Stitched in similarly complimentary regard, and concluded, "I am no expert on films, but I did not feel that shelling out £15 for this movie was anything else, except good value, for me at least".

References

External links 
 
 

2011 films
Avatar Press
2010s war films
2011 short films
2011 horror films
American war films
American horror short films
Zombie short films
Films set in deserts
American zombie films
Films shot in Arizona
2011 independent films
Works about the Taliban
Films set in Afghanistan
2011 direct-to-video films
American independent films
Direct-to-video horror films
American direct-to-video films
Films about military personnel
Films based on American comics
War in Afghanistan (2001–2021) films
2011 directorial debut films
2010s English-language films
2010s American films